FilmOn is an Internet-based television provider owned by FilmOn.TV Networks Inc. FilmOn.TV Networks is owned by Alki David, who founded the company in 2006.

Programming 
FilmOn is a subscription-based Internet-based television service allowing remote computer viewing of local TV worldwide. It licenses more than 600 additional channels plus 90,000 video-on-demand titles. Its library includes the CineBx and Allied Film libraries. It also allows users to create their own live and VOD channels. The channel lineup varies depending on what country it is being viewed in.

In 2010 FilmOn launched a streaming internet TV service for mobile devices. Filmon.com claimed it was going to launch an additional over-the-air distribution model using FilmOn AIR, a portable tuner that was supposed to send over-the-air HD channels to mobile devices and computers. In May 2012, FilmOn launched its Facebook app.

Other additions include Shockmasters, a channel devoted to Alfred Hitchcock movies and television shows; Bloodzillathon, a channel devoted to Japanese kaiju monster movies; and Voice of America TV, the first global streaming access to the U.S. Government's broadcaster since the laws changed in 2013 to allow transmission of VOA signals in the U.S.

On 1 May 2017, all channels were set to "Paid" - both SD and HD quality - which restricts viewing time to 2 minutes. Previously, SD quality channels were mostly free.

Legal issues 
FilmOn and Alki David have been involved in several legal issues over programming including the carriage of major U.S. broadcast channels, such as CBS (and its sister network, The CW), NBC, ABC and FOX (and its sister network, MyNetworkTV), among others.  This resulted in requiring FilmOn to drop these channels in 2011. In 2012, the channels were all returned after appeals were lodged in Federal Court and FilmOn launched its FilmOn Air X antenna farm. On September 5, 2013, Judge Rosemary Collyer of the United States District Court for the District of Columbia issued a nationwide injunction blocking FilmOn from offering its antenna/DVR service. However, the ruling did not apply in the Second Circuit (which includes the states of New York, Vermont, and Connecticut) due to an earlier case brought by Aereo one of FilmOn's competitors.

In July 2015, George H. Wu, Judge for the Central District of California ruled that FilmOn could qualify for a compulsory license for television content. However, as of late April 2016, the legal issue remained unsettled. Although it had granted judgment in FilmOn's favor, the Central District of California court maintained its preliminary injunction barring the company's streaming services pending the outcome of the appeal. Following a 2014 contempt of court ruling by the Second Circuit, FilmOn was also barred from transmitting broadcast television in that district and thus remained barred nationwide. The 2014-Second Circuit ruling found FilmOn in contempt of a 2012 injunction for continuing to deliver live TV streaming services after the U.S. Supreme Court deemed Aereo's service to be in violation of broadcast copyrights in American Broadcasting Cos. v. Aereo, Inc. (2014).

References

External links 
Federal Communications Commission (15 January 2015). "Promoting Innovation and Competition in the Provision of Multichannel Video Programming Distribution Services". Federal Register.
 

Internet properties established in 2008
Internet properties established in 2009
Streaming television
Companies based in London
Companies based in Los Angeles
Video on demand services